R. carnea may refer to:

 Reineckea carnea, a vascular plant
 Richia carnea, a South American moth